The North Baja Pipeline is an overall , bidirectional natural gas pipeline that can deliver gas from Arizona, through California, and into Mexico or from Mexico into the United States.

Information
The  U.S. portion of the system is owned by TC PipeLines LP, and the  Mexican portion is owned by Sempra Energy International.  Its FERC code is 181.

North Baja Pipeline was originally conceived as an east-to-west pipeline to provide electric power plants in Mexico with natural gas. An expansion added facilities to allow gas to flow from west to east, providing for importation of natural gas into the United States. The source of that natural gas is a liquefied natural gas terminal on the Pacific Coast of Mexico called Costa Azul (Energia Costa Azul), owned by a subsidiary of Sempra. The pipeline is capable of transporting up to 600 million cubic feet a day of natural gas in either direction.

See also

 List of North American natural gas pipelines

References

External links
 Pipeline Electronic Bulletin Board

Natural gas pipelines in Mexico
Natural gas pipelines in the United States
Natural gas pipelines in Arizona
Buildings and structures in Baja California
Natural gas pipelines in California
Energy in Arizona
Energy in California
Sempra Energy
TC Energy
Mexico–United States relations